Wildie is an unincorporated community located in Rockcastle County, Kentucky, United States. It is located on Kentucky Route 1250 southeast of Roundstone.

References

Unincorporated communities in Rockcastle County, Kentucky
Unincorporated communities in Kentucky